= Eunice Chan =

Hong Kong model and singer

Eunice Chan Sze-yan (Chinese: 陳詩欣), formerly known as Chan Sze-yan (陳思欣), is a Hong Kong model, singer, actress, and host. She is currently a contracted artist with Television Broadcasts Limited (TVB).

== Biography ==
Chan joined Television Broadcasts Limited (TVB) on November 1, 2017.

In April 2021, Chan married Chan Yee-ching.
